Rhabdomyosarcoma 2 associated transcript (RMST) is a long non-coding RNA. In humans, it is located on chromosome 12q21. It is expressed at higher levels in alveolar rhabdomyosarcoma than in embryonal rhabdomyosarcoma. In the brain, RMST is expressed in the developing ventral midbrain where dopaminergic neurons are formed, the developing isthmus and in the dorsal midline cells of the rostral neural tube. In the midbrain-hindbrain boundary region, its expression is regulated by PAX2.

See also
 Long noncoding RNA

References

Further reading

Non-coding RNA